Dallas College North Lake Campus station is a DART Light Rail station in the Las Colinas development of Irving, Texas. The station was proposed to be opened July 30, 2012 as a transfer point between three modified bus routes, but it was delayed until December 3, 2012, with the expansion of the Orange Line to Belt Line station.

The station was known as North Lake College station until 2021, when it was renamed at the request of Dallas College. In 2020, the college had consolidated seven previously separate institutions under one accreditation.

References

External links 
Dallas Area Rapid Transit

Dallas Area Rapid Transit light rail stations
Railway stations in the United States opened in 2012
Railway stations in Dallas County, Texas
Railway stations in Texas at university and college campuses
Transportation in Irving, Texas